Sharmila Sahiba Faruqui Hashaam (Urdu: شرمیلا صاحبہ فاروقی ہشام; born July 25, 1975) is a Pakistani politician from Karachi, affiliated with the Pakistan Peoples Party.

Early life and career 
She is the maternal granddaughter of N M Uqaili, former Pakistan Minister of Finance and daughter of Usman Farooqi, who was a bureaucrat and a former Chairman of Pakistan Steel Mill. Farooqi is the niece of Salman Farooqi, a well-known confidante of former President Asif Ali Zardari. Farooqi earned her Master of Business Administration from the Adamson Institute of Business Administration and Technology, Karachi and a Master of Laws degree. Sharmila Farooqi is engaged to Hasham Riaz Sheikh, a former Wall Street investment banker and presently an advisor to the former President Asif Ali Zardari. Sharmila married Hasham Riaz Sheikh on March 5, 2015. She regularly appears on TV political news/talk/public affairs News channels to defend her party and government from corruption allegations.

Prior joining politics as a Pakistan Peoples Party Leader, Sharmila has also worked as an actor. She appeared in a Drama serial "Panchwa Mausam" along with Aijaz Aslam, Talat Hussain, Abdullah Kadwani and Gulab Chandio.

She previously served as a member of Provincial Assembly of Sindh from 2013–2018 and was reelected in 2018 Pakistani general elections and later became its member in February 2020.

Corruption
In 2001, Faruqui along with her father Usman Farooqi, a former chairman of Pakistan Steel Mills, embezzled Rs 195 billion ($1.95 billion) from Pakistan Steel Mills and Government of Pakistan through political corruption and fraud. Anisa Farooqi, mother of Sharmila, entered into a plea bargain with the National Accountability Bureau on 28 April 2001 after being arrested with First Information Report (FIR) No. 19/96, and given into the custody of the Ehtesab Cell by the Special Judge, Central II, handling cases of top corrupt public servants like Usman Farooqi. Sharmila Farooqi and her family were extensively investigated by officers of the National Accountability Bureau, Federal Investigation Agency and officials Karachi Electric Supply Corporation due to the non-payment of electricity bills worth Rs 1 million.

See also
 Allah Baksh Sarshar Uqaili

References

External link

1978 births
Living people
Pakistan People's Party politicians
Sindhi people
20th-century Pakistani actresses
Pakistani actor-politicians
Sindh MPAs 2013–2018
Pakistani television actresses
Women members of the Provincial Assembly of Sindh
21st-century Pakistani actresses
Convent of Jesus and Mary, Karachi alumni
21st-century Pakistani women politicians
Sindh MPAs 2018–2023